E. K. Vijayan is the member of 14th Kerala Legislative Assembly. He is from the Communist Party of India and represents Nadapuram constituency.

Political life
He started his political life as the district secretary of All India Students' Federation. Presently, he is the president of motor vehicle workers' union and member of the state council of Communist Party of India in Kerala.

Personal life
He was born on 2 January 1953 at Muthuvana. His father is T.V Balakrishnan Kidavu and mother is E. K Kamalakshi Amma. His son is Ajay E K with an elder brother, Arjun E K.

References

1953 births
Members of the Kerala Legislative Assembly
Communist Party of India politicians from Kerala
Living people
People from Kozhikode district